Bihpuria Assembly constituency is one of the 126 assembly constituencies of Assam Legislative Assembly. Bihpuria forms part of the Tezpur Lok Sabha constituency.

Town Details

Following are details on Bihpuria Assembly constituency-

Country: India.
 State: Assam.
 District: Lakhimpur district .
 Lok Sabha Constituency: Tezpur Lok Sabha/Parliamentary constituency.
 Assembly Categorisation: Rural
 Literacy Level:  78.39%.
 Eligible Electors as per 2021 General Elections: 1,52,309 Eligible Electors. Male Electors:77,166 . Female Electors: 75,143.
 Geographic Co-Ordinates: 26°57'51.1"N 93°50'26.5"E.
 Total Area Covered: 549 square kilometres.
 Area Includes:  Bihpuria thana (excluding Laluk mouza) in North Lakhimpur sub- division, in Barpeta sub-division, of Lakhimpur district of Assam.
 Inter State Border : Lakhimpur.
 Number Of Polling Stations: Year 2011-179,Year 2016-180,Year 2021-109.

Members of Legislative Assembly 

Following is the list of past members representing Bihpuria Assembly constituency in Assam Legislature.

 1951: Sarveswar Borua, Indian National Congress.
 1962: Mohananda Bora, Indian National Congress.
 1967: Premadhar Bora, Independent.
 1972: Premadhar Bora, Independent.
 1978: Premadhar Bora, Independent.
 1983: Borgoram Deori, Indian National Congress.
 1985: Kesharam Bora, Independent.
 1991: Borgoram Deori, Indian National Congress.
 1996: Kesharam Bora, Asom Gana Parishad.
 2001: Premadhar Bora, Independent.
 2006: Bhupen Kumar Borah, Indian National Congress.
 2011: Bhupen Kumar Borah, Indian National Congress.
 2016: Debananda Hazarika, Bharatiya Janata Party.
 2021: Amiya Kumar Bhuyan, Bharatiya Janata Party.

Election results

2021 result

2016 result

External links

References

Assembly constituencies of Assam